The Butt of Lewis is the most northerly point of Lewis in the Outer Hebrides. The headland, which lies in the North Atlantic, is frequently battered by heavy swells and storms and is marked by the Butt of Lewis Lighthouse.

The road to the lighthouse passes a sheltered cove called Port Stoth. Southwest from the lighthouse is a natural arch called the "Eye of the Butt".

It is claimed that the Butt of Lewis is one of the windiest locations in the United Kingdom.

Lighthouse 

The Butt of Lewis Lighthouse was built by the famous lighthouse builder David Stevenson in 1862. Other sources include Thomas Stevenson as one of the builders too. Little is known of the station's early history. A plaque in the lightroom indicates that the present equipment was installed in 1905. The station became the radio link for the keepers on the isolated Flannan Islands in the early 1930s, and continued to function as such until 1971, when the Flannans was made automatic.

The light was most-likely fuelled by fish oil in the beginning. This was then replaced by a paraffin burner in 1869 and finally by electricity in 1976.

It was operated by three Keepers who lived at the Station with their families but the fog signal was discontinued on 31 March 1995 and the light was automated on 30 March 1998. It is now remotely monitored from Edinburgh.

Until the early 1960s, all supplies were delivered by sea because of the poor road system on the island. This would occur at the nearby Port Stoth, where small cargo vessels would regularly berth if the weather allowed it to offload provisions for the lighthouse station.

The Butt of Lewis was also one the General Lighthouse Authorities transmitting stations for Differential GPS until March 2022.

Eilean nan Luchruban 
One kilometre south-west of the Butt is a stack, or small island, of Eilean nan Luchruban, also known as the Pygmies' Isle. The isle was first mentioned by Dean Munro in about 1549 and described as being a ‘kirk’ where pygmies were buried. There are several structures on the island and earlier historical records mention bones in the structures. It was excavated by antiquarians sometime before 1905, when bones and pottery were found. The bones were found to be from animals and the pottery was later found to be from the Neolithic period.

RCAHMS surveyed the isle in 1928 and found part of the structures had collapsed since the excavations. A survey in 2005 found some additional structures not mentioned by the earlier sources.

Name 
The name is derived from Lusbirdan/Luspardan which, in both Gaelic and Scots, means "pigmy".  It is thought that it is derived from Lug/i-npiorad, which means "little spirit". In Blaeu's map, the name of the isle is Ylen Dunibeg ("Island of the Little Men").

Images

References

Isle of Lewis
Landforms of the Outer Hebrides
Headlands of Scotland
Natural arches of Scotland